Kitchener may refer to:

People
 Earl Kitchener, a title in the Peerage of the United Kingdom
 Herbert Kitchener, 1st Earl Kitchener (1850–1916), British Field Marshal and 1st Earl Kitchener
 Henry Kitchener, 2nd Earl Kitchener (1846–1937), British soldier, brother of the 1st Earl Kitchener
 Henry Kitchener, 3rd Earl Kitchener (1919–2011), grandson of the 2nd Earl Kitchener
 Sir Walter Kitchener (1858–1912), British soldier and colonial administrator. Brother of the 1st and 2nd Earls Kitchener
 Lord Kitchener (calypsonian) (1922–2000), musician from Trinidad and Tobago
 Barry Kitchener (1947-2012), English former professional footballer
 Graham Kitchener (born 1989), English rugby union player
 Professor Henry Kitchener (born 1951), British expert in gynaecological oncology

Places
 Kitchener, Ontario, a city in Canada
 Mount Kitchener, a mountain in the Canadian Rockies
 Kitchener's Island, an island in the Nile at Aswan, Egypt
 Kitchener, New South Wales, a town in New South Wales, Australia

Sports 
 Kitchener Dutchmen, a junior ice hockey team based in Kitchener, Ontario, Canada
 Kitchener Rangers, a junior ice hockey team based in Kitchener, Ontario, Canada
 Kitchener Panthers, a minor league baseball team of the inter-county Baseball League based in Kitchener, Ontario
 Kitchener-Waterloo Braves, a junior lacrosse team from Kitchener, Ontario, Canada
 Kitchener–Waterloo Kodiaks a senior lacrosse team from Waterloo, Ontario, Canada
  Kitchener-Waterloo Titans Basketball Club (KW Titans) a National Basketball League of Canada team

Other
 Kitchener's Army, a volunteer army in the First World War
 Kitchener bun, a bun from South Australia, similar to a Berliner